Becoming Wise: An Inquiry into the Mystery and Art of Living is a book by Krista Tippett which discusses the values and questions raised in the author's primary work, On Being, an award-winning podcast and radio program. A parallel podcast by the same name was released in tandem with the book. Becoming Wise: An Inquiry into the Mystery and Art of Living was published by Penguin Press in 2016. As the chapter titles suggest, the book focuses on five main concepts: words, flesh, love, faith, and hope.

References

Further reading
 

2016 non-fiction books
Penguin Press books
Audio podcasts